The Jefferson City Convicts were a minor league baseball teams based in Jefferson City, Missouri in 1902. In 1911, the Convicts were succeeded by the Jefferson City Senators. Jefferson City teams played as members of the 1902 Class D level Missouri Valley League and 1911 Missouri State League.

History
Jefferson City, Missouri first hosted minor league baseball in 1902. The Jefferson City "Convicts" became members of the Missouri Valley League. The Missouri Valley League formed in 1901 as an Independent league.

The Jefferson City use of the "Convicts" moniker corresponds to Jefferson City being home to the Missouri State Penitentiary in the era. The penitentiary held 2,200 prisoners in 1900.

The 1902 Missouri Valley League was designated as a Class D league and had eight teams. With a record of 40–85, the Jefferson City Convicts placed 7th in the 1902 Missouri Valley League standings, playing under managers A.B. Carey and E.J. Miller. In the final standings, the Nevada Lunatics finished 1st, with a 86–38 record, ahead of the 2nd place Springfield Reds (83–40), followed by the Fort Scott Giants (80–44), Sedalia Goldbugs (72–48), Joplin Miners (56–66), Coffeyville Indians/ Chanute Oilers (41–81), Jefferson City Convicts (40–85) and Iola Gasbags (34–90). The Jefferson City franchise folded after the 1902 season and were replaced by the Leavenworth White Sox in the 1903 Missouri Valley League.

On August 10, 1902, the Nevada Lunatics and Jefferson City Convicts played a game that resulted in a double no-hitter. Both Jefferson City's Jim Courtwright and Eli Cates of the Nevada Lunatics pitched no–hit games in a 1–0 Jefferson City victory. Nevada committed 5 errors in the contest. The rare occurrence has happened just 10 times in baseball history, all at the minor league level.

Minor league baseball returned to Jefferson City for a final season in 1911, with the team folding during the season. The Jefferson City Senators played as charter members of the Class D level Missouri State League. The "Senators" moniker was a aligns to Jefferson City being the state capitol of Missouri and the home of the legislative Missouri State Capitol building.

The 1911 Missouri State League began their first season as five–team league, with the Brookfield Hustlers, Kirksville Osteopaths, Macon Athletics and Sedalia Cubs joining Jefferson City as charter members. The Brookfield Hustlers franchise folded on May 19, 1911. Shortly after Brookfield folded, the Sedalia Cubs moved to Brookfield on May 24, 1911. When the Jefferson City Senators folded from the four–team league on June 2, 1911, its demise caused the Missouri State League to permanently fold on June 5, 1911. Jefferson City was in 3rd place with an 11–9 record under manager Jack Meyers when the franchise permanently folded.

The 1911 Senators were the last minor league team hosted in Jefferson City, Missouri.

Today, the Jefferson City Renegades play as members of the summer collegiate baseball M.I.N.K. League, beginning play in 2017.

The ballpark
The name of the ballpark for the Jefferson City minor league teams is unknown.

Timeline

Year–by–year records

Notable alumni
John Halla (1902)

See also
Jefferson City Convicts players

References

External links
Baseball Reference

Baseball teams established in 1902
Defunct minor league baseball teams
Professional baseball teams in Missouri
Baseball teams disestablished in 1911
Defunct baseball teams in Missouri
Defunct Missouri Valley League teams
Jefferson City, Missouri
Cole County, Missouri